Neptis strigata, the strigate sailer, is a butterfly in the family Nymphalidae. It is found in Ivory Coast, Ghana, Nigeria, Cameroon, the Republic of the Congo, the Central African Republic, the Democratic Republic of the Congo, Uganda, Rwanda, Kenya and Tanzania. The habitat consists of dense forests.

The larvae feed on Clerodendrum capitatum.

Subspecies
Neptis strigata strigata (Ivory Coast, Ghana, Nigeria, Cameroon, Congo, Central African Republic, Democratic Republic of the Congo) 
Neptis strigata kakamega Collins & Larsen, 1996 (Democratic Republic of the Congo: Kivu, Uganda, Rwanda, western Kenya, north-western Tanzania)

References

Butterflies described in 1894
strigata
Butterflies of Africa